Foping Nature Reserve in Shaanxi Province, China, is a nature reserve and national park situated in the Qinling Mountains. Foping Nature Reserve is girdled by other protected areas: It is bordered in the east by the Long-caoping Forest Farm; in the west it is flanked by the Changqing Nature Reserve; Zhouzhi Nature Reserve, the stronghold of the Golden Monkey, and Laoxiancheng Nature Reserve are situated to the north. Elevations range from 1,080 to 2,094 m with warm summers and cold winters.  950–1,200 mm of rain falls mostly from July to September, with snow at higher elevations. Forested lands dominate the reserve with a mix of conifers and broadleaf deciduous trees.

History
The Foping Nature Reserve was set up in 1978 with a view to protecting the giant panda.

Roads

Roads end at the reserve edge to minimize human presence in the interior of the reserve.

Flora and fauna

Mammals found in the reserve include the giant panda, golden monkey, mainland serow, Chinese goral, dwarf musk deer, Asiatic black bear, and North-Chinese leopard. Also red and white giant flying squirrel lives in the reserve.

Giant panda population
The Foping National Natural Reserve supported a relatively stable population of about 64 pandas from 1974 to 1993 where they avoided people and lived in areas with bamboo growing well.

See also
Qinling panda

References

External links
 

National parks of China
Parks in Shaanxi
Tourist attractions in Shaanxi